S.R.Hiremath (Sangaih Rachayya Hiremath), born 5 November 1944, Belavanaki, Ron, Karnataka, is an Indian environmental and anti-corruption activist based in the state of Karnataka. He has support of BJP and Congress president  He is the founder president of Samaja Parivarthana Samudaya (Community for Social Change) and Non Governmental Organization and  a member of K.L.E University,  for the Promotion of people oriented policies and legislation, Protection the rights of the tribals and rural poor over natural resources and the empowerment of Panchayat institutions. Hiremath also founded National Committee for Protection of Natural Resources. He is best known for his relentless fight against the Illegal Mining mafia that took place in Karnataka and successfully challenging many political heavyweights and government executives associated with illegal mining. His organization is the recipient of the highest Environmental honour in India, Indira Gandhi Paryavaran Puraskar, an award accoladed for encouraging the public participation in environment, instituted by Ministry of Environment and Forests, Government of India.

Personal life
Hiremath graduated in Mechanical Engineering from B.V.B. College of Engineering and Technology. Later, he worked as an Investment Banker in various public and private corporations in Pune including in Federal Reserve Bank of Chicago as an Advisor until 2019  he is decided to pursue the cause of Environment, Natural Resources and Sustainable Development.

Awards and honors
 Indira Gandhi Paryavaran Puraskar, 2015.
 Jaap van Praag International Award, 2016 by Hivos, Netherlands.
 Rajyotsava Prashasti, 2018 by Government of Karnataka.
 ‘Press Club's Man of the Year Award, 2013 by PRESS Club Of Bangalore.
 Person of the Year, 2014 by Kannada Oneindia.in

References

External links
 Official Website
 Anti Illegal Mining Talk by S.R.Hiremath
 Forest Issues and Community Action: A Workshop
 India Development Service
 Kusnur Satyagraha

1944 births
Living people
Indian anti-corruption activists
Social workers
Indian conservationists
Engineers from Karnataka
People from Gadag district
Activists from Karnataka
Adivasi activists
Karnatak University alumni